Bashir Eiti, or Bashir Iyti (born 1995), is a Syrian chess player. He was awarded the title of International Master (IM) in 2012.

Chess career
He has represented Syria in a number of Chess Olympiads, including 2012 (scoring 5/10 on board three), 2014 (6½/11 on board one) and (2018 (8/10 on board four).

He qualified to play in the Chess World Cup 2021 where he was defeated 2-0 by Rinat Jumabayev in the first round.

References

External links

Bashir Iyti chess games at 365chess.com

1995 births
Living people
Syrian chess players
Chess International Masters
Chess Olympiad competitors